Antoine Bello (born 25 March 1970) is a French-American author born in Boston, Massachusetts, whose works have been widely translated. His novels touch on multiple subjects, such as the relation between reality and fiction, human cognition and journalism. He writes in French, his native tongue. He has been living in the greater New York Area since 2002.

Work
Bello's first book, Les Funambules, a collection of short stories, was published in France in 1996. It received the Prix littéraire de la vocation awarded by the Fondation Bleustein-Blanchet. One of the short stories included in Les Funambules had received the Prix du jeune écrivain de langue française in 1993.

Since then, Bello's has published nine novels, which have been translated into a dozen languages, such as German, Russian, Greek and Japanese. Six of them are available in English : The Falsifiers (Kindle Edition, 2015), The Pathfinders (Kindle Edition, 2016), The Showrunners (Kindle Edition, 2017), An American Novel (Kindle Edition, 2016), The Disappearance of Emilie Brunet (Kindle Edition, 2016), and The Missing Piece.
All his books have been published by Éditions Gallimard.

Bello's main body of work, known as the Falsificateurs trilogy, centers around a secret international organization, the CFR, which falsifies reality and rewrites history. The first installment, Les Falsificateurs (The Falsifiers), was published in 2007. Les Éclaireurs was awarded the prestigious Prix France Culture - Télérama award in 2009. Les Producteurs was released in 2015. Bello's trilogy has taken a new significance with the current debate about fake news, prompting him to give interviews in French and Canadian media.

Bello is a staunch supporter of Wikipedia. Since 2014, he has been donating his royalties to the Wikimedia Foundation and urging his readers to follow suit. In an interview to the web-hosting company OVH, he compared Wikipedia to a public service. In another interview with the Wikimedia Foundation, he said he was humbled by the editors' dedication: "Every time I use it [Wikipedia], I think of the people who have taken the time and devoted long evenings doing that. And I wonder, ‘Who are these people? Why did they do it? What an appetite for knowledge and for sharing it they must have.’ And I feel blessed that people do that."

Other pursuits 
Prior to becoming a full-time writer, Bello co-founded the French company Ubiqus, which he sold in 2007. He's also the creator of the now-defunct ranking website Rankopedia.

In 2021, Bello founded The Population Project, an attempt at listing the full names and dates of birth of all humans alive.

Bibliography 
 Les Funambules, recueil de nouvelles (Manikin 100, Soltino, Go Ganymède !, Le dossier Krybolski et L'année Zu), éditions Gallimard, 1996. , 
 Éloge de la pièce manquante, éditions Gallimard, 1998. , 
 Les Falsificateurs, éditions Gallimard, 2007. , 
 Les Éclaireurs, éditions Gallimard, 2009. , 
 Enquête sur la disparition d'Émilie Brunet, éditions Gallimard, 2010. , 
 Mateo, éditions Gallimard, 2013. , 
 Roman américain, éditions Gallimard, 2014. , 
 Les Producteurs, éditions Gallimard, 2015. , 
 Ada, éditions Gallimard, 2016. , 
 L'homme qui s'envola, éditions Gallimard, 2017. , 
 Scherbius (et moi), éditions Gallimard, 2018. , 

Works in English
The Missing Piece Orlando : Harcourt, 2003, 
 The Falsifiers (e-book only)
 The Pathfinders (e-book only)
 The Showrunners (e-book only)
 The Disappearance of Émilie Brunet (e-book only)
 An American Novel (e-book only)
 Ada (e-book only)
 The Man Who Vanished (e-book only)

Translations from English to French
 Du rififi à Wall Street, Vlad Eisinger, éditions Gallimard, 2020 ,

Decorations and awards 
 Young Leader of the French-American Foundation (2009)
 Prix France-Culture/Telerama for Les Éclaireurs (The Pathfinders) (2009).
 Chevalier of the Order of Arts and Letters (2015)
 Prix Version Femina for L'homme qui s'envola (2017).
 Prix Charles Brisset, awarded by the French Association of Psychiatry, for Scherbius (and me) (2018).

References

External links
 Official website
 Bello's page on Goodreads

1970 births
20th-century French novelists
20th-century French male writers
21st-century French novelists
Chevaliers of the Ordre des Arts et des Lettres
French male novelists
French male short story writers
French mystery writers
Living people
Writers from Boston
20th-century French short story writers
21st-century French short story writers
21st-century French male writers